Gornja Ljuboviđa is a village in Serbia. It is situated in the Ljubovija municipality, in the Mačva District of Central Serbia. The village had a Serb ethnic majority and a population of 443 in 2002.

Historical population

1948: 970
1953: 1,040
1961: 973
1971: 772
1981: 643
1991: 524
2002: 443

References

See also
List of places in Serbia

Populated places in Mačva District
Ljubovija